Alessandro Criscuolo (15 July 1937 – 10 March 2020) was an Italian judge. He was President of the Constitutional Court of Italy between 12 November 2014 and 24 February 2016. He served as a Judge on the Court between 2008 and 2017.

Career
Criscuolo was born in Naples. He was elected to the Constitutional Court by the Court of Cassation on 28 October 2008, and he was sworn in on 11 November 2008. Criscuolo was elected President of the Constitutional Court on 12 November 2014. He was elected with eight votes. He served as President until 24 February 2016. His term as Judge ended on 11 November 2017.

Criscuolo died on 10 March 2020 in Naples.

References

1937 births
2020 deaths
Jurists from Naples
Judges of the Constitutional Court of Italy
Presidents of the Constitutional Court of Italy